For main Top 5 Division, see: 2012 Asian Five Nations

The 2012 Asian Five Nations division tournaments, known as the 2012 HSBC Asian 5 Nations due to the tournament's sponsorship by the HSBC, refer to the divisions played within the tournament. This was the 5th series of the Asian Five Nations.

There were five divisions in the 2012 version who contested for a place in the Top 5 tournament. Who ever finished last place in a division was relegated, while the winner of a division was promoted. Last place in division 1 was replaced by the winner of division 2, winner of division 3 replaced last place in division 2, winner in division 4 replaced last in division 3 and winner in division 5 replaced last in division 4.

Changes from 2011
 Sri Lanka participated in the Division 1 tournament, haven been relegated from the Top 5.
 South Korea returned to the Top 5 division, after a year in the First Division.
 Chinese Taipei have replaced Malaysia in Division 1, with Malaysia competing in Division 2.
 China will compete in Division 2 - replacing India, following promotion from Division 3.
 Brunei joins Cambodia and Laos in Division 5.

Teams
The teams involved, with their world rankings pre tournament, were:

Division 1
  (57)
  (72)
  (52)
  (46)

Division 2
  (62)
  (NA)
  (63)
  (65)

Division 3
  (88)
  (77)
  (NA)
  (73)

Division 4
  (NA)
  (NA)
  (NA)
  (NA)

Division 5
  (NA)
  (NA)
  (NA)

Division 1

For the first time, division one was held in a round-robin format. All games were played in Manila, Philippines on April 14–21, 2012. The Philippines was promoted to the main division in 2013, while Singapore was relegated to division II for 2013.

Table

Points are awarded to the teams as follows:

Fixtures

Division 2

Semi-finals

Third place play-off

Final

  promoted to 2013 Division one
  relegated to 2013 Division three

Division 3

Semi-finals

Third place play-off

Final

  promoted to 2013 Division two
  relegated to 2013 Division four

Division 4

Semi-finals

Third place play-off

Final

  promoted to 2013 Division three

Division 5

Table

Points are awarded to the teams as follows:

Fixtures

References

External links
Official Website
ARFU
Division 1 Results, Asian 5 Nations

2012
2012 in Asian rugby union
Asia